John Fitchett may refer to:

 John Fitchett (poet) (1776–1838), English poet
 Jack Fitchett (1880–?), English footballer